James Penny (died 1799) was a merchant, slave ship owner, and prominent opponent of the abolition of slavery in Liverpool, England. He defended the slave trade to the British Parliament. The famous Penny Lane has been associated with him although it is now widely regarded as of an unconnected origin.

Early life
Penny was probably not a native of Liverpool and may have been born in Ulverston.  He came to Liverpool to work as a mariner and was married to Ann Cooper in 1768. He is subsequently referred to as a mariner, ship's captain and merchant in Liverpool directories. 

Penny was active in the slave trade until the American Revolutionary War. He returned to the trade after the war as a shipowner and as a business partner with other traders. He was involved in several slave trading companies and was known for his knowledge of the African coast derived from  his many journeys dating back to 1776. 

When in 1788, the British government launched an inquiry into the slave trade, following public pressure from abolitionists, Penny was chosen to represent the views of slavers. According to local historian F.E. Sanderson, he was a "man of considerable stature in the town, highly regarded by his fellow merchants, his forthright views on the slave trade must have brought him to their notice as a likely delegate".

Evidence to Parliament
In the possible evidence he gave the British Government, Penny claimed that "he found himself impelled, both by humanity and interest, to pay every possible attention both to the preservation of the crew and the slaves." He stated that he allowed the slaves on the Atlantic slave route to play games and dance and sing.
 

In the same body of evidence, he notes that the fatality rate for his slaves was one in twelve, and that "The average allowance of width to a slave is fourteen and two-thirds inches." Penny also argued that abolition of the trade would destroy the economy of Liverpool; "it would not only greatly affect the commercial interest, but also the landed property of the County of Lancaster and more particularly, the Town of Liverpool; whose fall, in that case, would be as rapid as its rise has been astonishing."

Later life
In 1792 he was presented with a silver epergne for speaking in favour of the slave trade to a parliamentary committee. He continued to be committed to the slave trade even when other merchants were moving away from it. With his eldest son, James, he was elected to the African Company of Merchants trading in Liverpool in July 1793. He died in 1799.

One of Penny's daughters married the writer Christopher North.

References

External links
 Anti-abolitionism in Liverpool
 Liverpool and the slave trade
 On the Street name Penny Lane 

Year of birth missing
1799 deaths
Proslavery activists
English slave traders
People from Ulverston